Euxesta sanguinea is a species of ulidiid or picture-winged fly in the genus Euxesta of the family Ulidiidae.

References

sanguinea
Insects described in 1913